Sir Thomas Raymond Dunne,  (born 24 October 1933) was the Lord Lieutenant of Hereford and Worcester from 1977, then (after the historic counties were restored) from 1998 the Lord Lieutenant of Worcestershire until 2001 and the Lord Lieutenant of Herefordshire until 2008.

Biography
Sir Thomas was born in 1933, the son of Philip Russell Rendel Dunne, a military officer and politician.  He was educated at Eton College and at the Royal Military Academy Sandhurst.

He was appointed Lord Lieutenant of Hereford and Worcester in 1977, three years after the administrative counties of Herefordshire and Worcestershire were merged to form Hereford and Worcester. In 1995, he was knighted as a Knight Commander of the Royal Victorian Order. In 1998, Hereford and Worcester reverted to its original counties, and Sir Thomas became Lord Lieutenant of Herefordshire and Lord Lieutenant of Worcestershire. He retired from the latter on 31 July 2001. He is Chairman of the Lord Lieutenants Association. In 2008, he was made a Knight Companion of the Order of the Garter.

Family
Sir Thomas is the father of:

 Camilla Rose Dunne, married to Hon Rupert Soames (son of Lord Soames and Mary, Lady Soames, and a grandson of Sir Winston Churchill) in 1988.
 Philip Martin Dunne, Conservative Party Member of Parliament for Ludlow since 2005.
 Letitia Dunne. 
 Nicholas Dunne, married to Lady Jasmine Cavendish, daughter of the 12th Duke of Devonshire

Arms

References

|-

|-

|-

1933 births
Living people
Knights of the Garter
Knights Commander of the Royal Victorian Order
Lord-Lieutenants of Hereford and Worcester
Lord-Lieutenants of Herefordshire
Lord-Lieutenants of Worcestershire
People educated at Eton College
Graduates of the Royal Military Academy Sandhurst
People associated with the Royal National College for the Blind